Ilse Buding (born 22 November 1939) is a German former tennis player of Romanian birth who was active from the mid-1950s until 1970.

Buding began playing tennis at age 11 in Buenos Aires, Argentina, where the family had moved to after World War II. In May 1954 she became the Argentinian junior singles champion.

She became the French Championships girls' singles champion in 1957 after a victory in the final against Pierrette Seghers.

At the Wimbledon Championships Buding made it to the second round of the singles event in 1957, 1959, and 1961. In the doubles event she reached the quarterfinal in 1958 and 1959. In 1956 she reached the final of the All England Plate, a Wimbledon competition for players who were defeated in the first or second rounds of the singles competition, which she lost in two sets to Thelma Coyne.

She won the women's doubles event at the Egyptian International Championships in 1957 partnering her sister Edda.

Personal life
She was born on 22 November 1939 in Lovrin, Romania, the second-youngest of four children of Franz and Erika Buding. Her brother Ingo was a two-time junior singles champion at the French Championships, while her sister Edda reached three Grand Slam doubles finals. Buding married British tennis player Mike Davies in July 1959. With her siblings Edda and Ingo she ran a tennis school in Bandol, France, in the late 1970s which their father had founded.

References

External links
 

1939 births
Romanian people of German descent
West German female tennis players
People from Timiș County
Living people
French Open junior champions
Argentine female tennis players
Grand Slam (tennis) champions in girls' singles